This is a list of hat-tricks in the AFC Asian Cup, that being when a player scores three or more goals in a tournament match of the AFC Asian Cup (not including qualification matches). Hat-tricks have occurred 18 times across the 17 editions.

The first tournament was held in 1956, however no hat-tricks were scored in the first four competitions. The first instance was in 1972, where Hossein Kalani scored three goals for Iran against Iraq in the group stage. Later on in the same tournament again for Iran, Ali Jabbari scored three goals inside nine minutes to defeat Thailand 3–2. The first time a player would score four goals in a match would be 1980, where Behtash Fariba achieved the feat in a 7–0 win for Iran over Bangladesh. After 1980, three tournaments went by without a hat-trick before Ali Daei scored four goals for Iran in a 6–2 win over South Korea in 1996, also marking the first time at least three goals were scored in a match in the knockout stage. Two tournaments later in 2004, another knockout stage hat-trick was achieved by Ali Karimi for Iran in a 4–3 win against South Korea, again in the quarter-finals.

Iran have scored the most hat-tricks with six, while Bangladesh and Uzbekistan have conceded the most, with three each. No player has scored multiple hat-tricks in the Asian Cup. Also, every hat-trick scorer has had their side go on to win their match.

Hat-tricks

By nation

References 

hat-tricks
AFC Asian Cup
AFC Asian Cup